The 1975–76 season was Blackpool F.C.'s 68th season (65th consecutive) in the Football League. They competed in the 22-team Division Two, then the second tier of English football, finishing tenth, with a symmetrical record of fourteen wins, fourteen draws and fourteen losses.

Mickey Walsh was the club's top scorer for the second consecutive season, with seventeen goals.

Table

Notes

References

External links
"Towers of strength" - Sunderland Echo

Blackpool F.C.
Blackpool F.C. seasons